Viktor Grigorievich Savchenko (born 17 September 1952) is a retired Ukrainian amateur middleweight boxer. He won the European title in 1977, the world title in 1978, and two Olympic medals in 1976 and 1980. Savchenko was the Soviet middleweight champion in 1977 and 1980. He retired in 1982 with a record of 241 wins out of 271 bouts, and the same year graduated from the Dnipropetrovsk State Institute of Physical Culture. He later defended a PhD in pedagogy, and became department head and then rector at the same institute. He also served as a board member of the Ukrainian Boxing Federation and headed the Sports and Physical Culture Committee of Verkhovna Rada.

References

1952 births
Living people
Light-middleweight boxers
Boxers at the 1976 Summer Olympics
Boxers at the 1980 Summer Olympics
Olympic boxers of the Soviet Union
Olympic silver medalists for the Soviet Union
Olympic bronze medalists for the Soviet Union
Olympic medalists in boxing
Ukrainian male boxers
Soviet male boxers
AIBA World Boxing Championships medalists
Medalists at the 1980 Summer Olympics
Medalists at the 1976 Summer Olympics
Honoured Masters of Sport of the USSR
Second convocation members of the Verkhovna Rada
Ukrainian sportsperson-politicians